The Greater Dublin Area Cycle Network is a proposed cycle network for the Greater Dublin Area. The plan was launched in 2013.

A target, endorsed by the Irish government, proposed that the number of people commuting into Dublin would reach "75,000 each morning by 2021", representing a "three-fold increase in cycling over 2011 levels". A significant part of the proposed plan, as published in 2013, expected that the Greater Dublin Area's cycle network would increase "five fold" from 500 km in length to over 2,800 km by 2020. The planned targets were not met. 

In August 2018, 78 companies and third-level education institutions called on the government to build a network of segregated cycle routes in Dublin. This call was reiterated by the National Children's Hospital and St. James's Hospital in 2019.
The letter from St James's Hospital to the Minister for Transport cited worrying levels of air pollution, adding, 

As of mid-2021, the National Transport Authority (NTA) website noted that "the NTA [..was then..] in the process of updating the GDA Cycle Network Plan" and that it planned to publish this update "later in 2021".

References

Cycling infrastructure
Cycling in Ireland
Transport infrastructure
Transport in Dublin (city)
Dublin
Transport in County Kildare
Transport in County Meath
Transport in County Wicklow